Paxtaobod is an urban-type settlement in Sirdaryo Region, Uzbekistan. It is the administrative center of Sardoba District. The town population in 1989 was 10196 people.

References

Populated places in Sirdaryo Region
Urban-type settlements in Uzbekistan